Bill MacIntosh (born 3 September 1930) is a Canadian former sailor who competed in the 1952 Summer Olympics.

References

1930 births
Living people
Canadian male sailors (sport)
Olympic sailors of Canada
Sailors at the 1952 Summer Olympics – 6 Metre